A Christmas Story is a 1972 American animated Christmas television special produced by Hanna-Barbera Productions which was broadcast in syndication on December 9, 1972.

Summary
As a family gathers around the tree on Christmas Eve, their son Timmy has made a special wish in his letter to Santa Claus. But the letter is found – unmailed – by the lovable family dog Goober and his friend, Gumdrop the mouse. Together, they set off into the snowy night to deliver the letter to Santa. Overcoming many perils – including a lurking gang of alley cats – they finally find Santa. Timmy's letter is delivered, Gumdrop and Goober make it home safely and a boy's special wish magically comes true on Christmas.

Featured songs
The songs featured in A Christmas Story included:

"Sounds of Christmas Day"
"O Come, All Ye Faithful"
"Where Do You Look for Santa?"
"Hope"
"Which One is the Real Santa Claus?"
"Sounds of Christmas Day'" uses the same melody as "Those Happy Friends Who Live in My TV," from the Enchanted Voyage attraction at The Happy Land of Hanna-Barbera, which opened the same year at King's Island in Cincinnati, Ohio. "Which One is the Real Santa Claus?", "Sounds of Christmas Day" and "Hope" were re-used five years later in the 1977 TV special A Flintstone Christmas. "Hope" was also re-used in Yogi's First Christmas (1980).

Voices
Daws Butler – Gumdrop, Second Dog
Paul Winchell – Goober, Sleezer, Runto
Walter Tetley – Timmy, Boy
Janet Waldo – Timmy's Mother, Girl
Don Messick – Timmy's Father, Squirrel
John Stephenson – Polecat, Postman, First Dog
Hal Smith – Santa Claus, Fatcat

Production credits
Produced and Directed By William Hanna and Joseph Barbera
Associate Producer: Alex Lovy
Story: Ken Spears, Joe Ruby
Voices: Daws Butler, Don Messick, Hal Smith, John Stephenson, Walter Tetley, Janet Waldo, Paul Winchell, Paul DeKorte, Randy Kemner, Stephen McAndrew, Susie McCune, Judi Richards
Animation Director: Charles A. Nichols
Production Design: Iwao Takamoto
Layout: Mike Arens, Ric Gonzalez, Dan Noonan
Backgrounds: F. Montealegre, Gary Niblett
Animation: Ed Barge, Bill Hutten, Tony Love, Jerry Hathcock, Ed Love, Don Patterson, Ray Patterson
Production Supervisor: Victor O. Schipek
Musical Director: Hoyt Curtin
Technical Supervisor: Frank Paiker
Ink & Paint Supervisor: Roberta Greutert
Xerography: Robert "Tiger" West
Sound Direction: Richard Olson, Bill Getty
Editorial Supervisor: Larry Cowan
Music Editor: Pat Foley
Effects Editor: Earl Bennett
Negative Consultant: William E. DeBoer
Post Production: Joed Eaton
Camera: Charles Flekal, Roy Wade

Home media
Released by AVCO Broadcasting Corp. in the early 1970’s for use with Cartrivision. Cartrivision item number 10264S-NN.

The special was first released on VHS as part of the Hanna-Barbera Super Stars video collection by Hanna-Barbera Home Video on November 9, 1989, and re-released again on September 26, 1995 by Turner Home Entertainment.

On July 31, 2012, Warner Home Video released Hanna-Barbera Christmas Classics Collection on DVD in region 1 via their Warner Archive Collection burn on demand service. This collection features a trilogy of Christmas specials: A Christmas Story, The Town Santa Forgot and Casper's First Christmas.

See also
List of Christmas films
List of works produced by Hanna-Barbera Productions
List of United States Christmas television specials

References

External links

1972 television specials
1970s American television specials
1970s animated short films
1970s animated television specials
Christmas television specials
Hanna-Barbera television specials
Films scored by Hoyt Curtin
Fictional dogs
Fictional mice and rats
Santa Claus in television
First-run syndicated television programs in the United States
Animated Christmas television specials
1972 films
1970s American films